This is a list of mayors of the city of Neuchâtel, Switzerland. The executive of the city of Neuchâtel is its Conseil communal. Its annual presiding member is the Président du Conseil communal.

Neuchatel
 
Neuchâtel